John Thomas Deweese (June 4, 1835 – July 4, 1906) was a Congressional Representative from North Carolina.

Biography
Born in Van Buren, Arkansas, on June 4, 1835, Deweese was educated at home, where he studied law; he was admitted to the bar in 1856 and commenced practice in Henderson, Kentucky. He later lived in Denver, Colorado, for some years, but moved to Pike County, Indiana, in 1860.

DeWeese entered the Union Army on July 6, 1861, as second lieutenant of Company E, Twenty-fourth Regiment, Indiana Volunteer Infantry, and served with that command until February 15, 1862, when he resigned. He was quickly mustered in as captain of Company F, Fourth Indiana Cavalry, on August 8, 1862, and was successively promoted to rank of colonel; he was brevetted Brigadier-General of Volunteers effective March 13, 1865. Upon the reorganization of the Army he was appointed second lieutenant, in the Eighth United States Infantry, on July 24, 1866. Following the war, he moved to North Carolina.

He resigned from the Army on August 14, 1867, having been elected to Congress. He was appointed register in bankruptcy for North Carolina in 1868; upon the readmission of North Carolina to the Union, DeWeese was elected as a Republican to the Fortieth and Forty-first Congresses and served from July 6, 1868, to February 28, 1870. During that time, he was the chairman of Committee on Expenditures in the Department of the Interior and on the Committee on Revolutionary Pensions.

He resigned his seat in 1870 when he was censured by the House of Representatives on March 1, 1870, for selling an appointment to the Naval Academy. He then switched parties and became a delegate to the Democratic National Convention in 1876, resumed the practice of law, and died in Washington, D.C., on July 4, 1906. He is interred in Arlington National Cemetery.

See also

40th United States Congress
41st United States Congress
List of United States representatives expelled, censured, or reprimanded

References

U.S. Congressional Biographical Directory entry

|-

1835 births
1906 deaths
19th-century American politicians
Burials at Arlington National Cemetery
Censured or reprimanded members of the United States House of Representatives
Kentucky lawyers
North Carolina Democrats
People from Van Buren, Arkansas
People of Indiana in the American Civil War
Republican Party members of the United States House of Representatives from North Carolina
Union Army colonels